Ben Zion Moshel (born July 31, 1993) is an Israeli footballer who plays for Hapoel Ramat Gan.

References

1993 births
Living people
Israeli footballers
F.C. Ashdod players
Hapoel Ashdod F.C. players
Hapoel Ramat Gan F.C. players
Israeli Premier League players
Liga Leumit players
Footballers from Ashdod
Israeli people of Azerbaijani-Jewish descent
Association football forwards